Mika Yamauchi (山内 美加 Yamauchi Mika, born October 7, 1969) is a former volleyball player from Japan, who was a member of the Japan Women's National Team.
Her nickname is Mika (ミカ).

Profile
Birthplace: Yurihonjo, Akita
Height: 182 cm

National team
1992: 5th place in the Olympic Games of Barcelona
1993: 4th place in the Grand Champions Cup
1994: 7th place in the World Championship
1995: 6th place in the World Cup
1996: 9th place in the Olympic Games of Atlanta

References

Olympic volleyball players of Japan
Volleyball players at the 1992 Summer Olympics
Volleyball players at the 1996 Summer Olympics
Japanese women's volleyball players
1969 births
Living people
Asian Games medalists in volleyball
Volleyball players at the 1994 Asian Games
Medalists at the 1994 Asian Games
Asian Games bronze medalists for Japan
Goodwill Games medalists in volleyball
Competitors at the 1994 Goodwill Games